Ödön Zombori, originally Ödön Janicsek (22 September 1906 in Szenta - 29 November 1989 in Budapest) was a Hungarian wrestler and Olympic champion in Freestyle wrestling.

Olympics
Zombori competed at the 1936 Summer Olympics in Berlin where he received a gold medal in Freestyle wrestling, the bantamweight class. He received a silver medal in 1932. During the 1984 Olympics in Los Angeles, California Zombori was invited to attend a number of events as he and his wife Anna lived in the Hollywood area of Los Angeles at the time. As his health began to deteriorate he wished to return to Hungary and lived for some time at a home in Hungary for retired Olympic and Sports champions. He died in 1989 due to complications from Alzheimer's disease.

References

External links
 

1906 births
1989 deaths
Olympic wrestlers of Hungary
Wrestlers at the 1928 Summer Olympics
Wrestlers at the 1932 Summer Olympics
Wrestlers at the 1936 Summer Olympics
Hungarian male sport wrestlers
Olympic gold medalists for Hungary
Olympic silver medalists for Hungary
Olympic medalists in wrestling
Medalists at the 1936 Summer Olympics
Medalists at the 1932 Summer Olympics
Sportspeople from Somogy County
20th-century Hungarian people